Douglas Spotted Eagle (born Douglas Wallentine) is a musician and producer, primarily known for audio engineering and production, for which he has won a Grammy Award, as well as for playing the Native American-style flute. He is listed in the Library of Folk Music, The Native American Almanac, and NAIIP Musical Paths as a non-Native flautist who composes New Age and "contemporary ethnic" music.

Music career
His music mixes jazz, new age, pop, and world beat with his interpretations of Native American music. In his book, World Music, Richard Nidel described him as a flautist and film composer "who incorporates synthesizers into Native sounds."

Video production and software
Spotted Eagle is the producer of Sundance Media Group's 2002 video The Way of the Pow-Wow.

Background and personal life
Spotted Eagle is not Native American himself. Born Douglas Wallentine, he was raised in a non-Native family in Valley Junction, Iowa. After his family moved to Salt Lake City, Utah, he was a guitarist in a Christian rock  band.

He says he grew up around Lakota and Navajo families in Iowa and Utah, the former of which he says gave him his name when he was 14 or 16. However, his claims of adoption into any Native American culture, his use of a Native American-sounding name, and concerns around the Indian Arts and Crafts Act have led to writers and reviewers emphasizing that he is not Native American.

Spotted Eagle lives in Utah. He lost his son Joshua Davis Wallentine to suicide.

His hobbies include wingsuiting. In 2015 he was appointed the U.S. Team Manager for the First World Cup of Wingsuit Performance Flying.

Discography
 1990 - Sacred Feelings (SOAR)
 1991 - CanyonSpeak (SOAR; reissued 2000)
 1991 - Legend of the Flute Boy (SOAR; reissued 2007)
 1992 - Stand at the Center (Natural Visions NV101)
 1993 - Human Rites (Natural Visions NV102)
 1994 - Ultimate Collection (Natural Visions/NV103)
 1994 - Common Ground (Natural Visions/NV106)
 1995 - Between Father Sky and Mother Earth by Various Artists
 1996 - Closer to far Away (Windham Hill/BMG)
 1997 - Tenaya: Ode to Yosemite (Natural Visions/NV120)
 1998 - Pray (Higher Octave)
 1999 - Voices

Publications
 Making Arrows the Old Way!! (as Doug Wallentine. Later reissued after name change) Eagles View Publishing / self-published (1987)
 Voices of Native America: Native American Music Eagles View Publishing / self-published (1997) 
 Using Soundtrack: Produce Original Music for Video, DVD, and Multimedia (2004) 
 Instant Encore DVD 1.5 (2004) 
 Instant Vegas 5 (2004) 
 Digital Video Basics: Your Guide to Making Great Movies (2004) 
 HDV: What You NEED to Know (2004)
 Instant Digital Audio: VASST Instant Series (2005 ) 
 HDV : What You NEED to Know! **Second Edition**, The Complete Guide (2006)

References

American flautists
Living people
Musicians from Utah
Place of birth missing (living people)
Windham Hill Records artists
1962 births